Hellmut May (June 9, 1921 – November 11, 2011) was a figure skater who represented Austria at the Winter Olympics in 1936 and 1948.

Life and career 
Hellmut May was 14 years old when he competed at the 1936 Winter Olympics in Garmisch-Partenkirchen, Germany, finishing 14th. In May 1941, he was drafted into the army for World War II and later spent time in American and British POW camps. His family's apartment was damaged by a bomb but his mother retrieved his skates. May finished eighth at the 1948 Winter Olympics in St. Moritz, Switzerland.

May emigrated to Canada in 1954. In 1955, he became the head coach at the Kerrisdale Figure Skating Club in Vancouver, British Columbia. He was the first coach of Karen Magnussen.

May was inducted into the Skate Canada Hall of Fame in 2010 and died in November 2011 in Richmond, British Columbia. He was married to Andrea May.

Results

References

External links 
 Skate Canada Hall of Fame

1921 births
2011 deaths
Austrian male single skaters
Canadian figure skating coaches
Olympic figure skaters of Austria
Figure skaters at the 1936 Winter Olympics
Figure skaters at the 1948 Winter Olympics
Figure skaters from Vienna
People from Richmond, British Columbia
German Army personnel of World War II
German prisoners of war in World War II held by the United States
German prisoners of war in World War II held by the United Kingdom